Sarasota Military Academy (SMA) is a military academy charter school founded in 2002 in Sarasota, Florida. The academy consists of a middle school and a high school. The school's athletic teams compete as the Eagles. Other extracurricular activities include JROTC programs and a drum line squad.

Notable alumni
 Mary Tucker, American Olympic sports shooter, world champion in 10 meter air rifle

References

2002 establishments in Florida
Buildings and structures in Sarasota, Florida
Charter schools in Florida
Educational institutions established in 2002
High schools in Sarasota County, Florida
Public high schools in Florida